Arthur Ibbetson BSC (8 September 1922 in Bishop Auckland, England – 19 October 1997 in Hillingdon, Middlesex, England) was a British cinematographer.

Biography

Ibbetson was born in Bishop Auckland, England in 1922, and died from cancer in Hillingdon, Middlesex, England.

Starting out as a child actor in 1935, his best-known projects as a cinematographer were films with or for children, including Whistle Down the Wind (1961), The Railway Children (1970) and Willy Wonka & the Chocolate Factory (1971).

Awards
Nominee Best Cinematography British Society of Cinematographers - The Bounty (1984)
Nominee Best cinematography (for a series or special) Emmy Award - Witness for the Prosecution (1982)
Winner Best Cinematography (for a series or special) Emmy Award - Little Lord Fauntleroy (1980)
Nominee Best Cinematography Academy Award - Anne of the Thousand Days (1969)
Nominee Best Cinematography BAFTA - The Chalk Garden (1964)
Nominee Best Cinematography BAFTA - Nine Hours to Rama (1963)

Selected filmography
 Poet's Pub (1949)
The Horse's Mouth (1958)
The Angry Silence (1960)
The League of Gentlemen (1960)
There Was a Crooked Man (1960)
Tunes of Glory (1960)
Whistle Down the Wind (1961)
 The Inspector (1962)
Nine Hours to Rama (1963)
Murder at the Gallop (1963)
The Chalk Garden (1964)
Fanatic (1965)
A Countess from Hong Kong (1967)
Inspector Clouseau (1968)
Where Eagles Dare (1968)
Anne of the Thousand Days (1969)
The Railway Children (1970)
When Eight Bells Toll (1971)
Willy Wonka & the Chocolate Factory (1971)
Frankenstein: The True Story (1973, TV)
It Shouldn't Happen to a Vet (1975)
A Little Night Music (1978)
The Medusa Touch (1979)
The Prisoner of Zenda (1979)
The Bounty (1984)
Santa Claus: The Movie (1984)
Babes in Toyland (1986)

References

External links
 

British cinematographers
1922 births
1997 deaths